Cuts is an extended play (EP) by American hard rock band L.A. Guns. Recorded at Red Zone Studios in Burbank, California, it was self-produced by the band and released on December 2, 1992 by Polydor Records. The standard edition of the EP features five tracks, including three cover versions, one re-recording and one new song. The Japanese edition includes two additional cover versions. Cuts is the first L.A. Guns release to feature drummer Michael "Bones" Gershima.

Background
Released in December 1992, Cuts was issued in response to rumors that L.A. Guns were due to split up, with the news that the band would be recording a new studio album the following year. The EP includes three cover versions – of Generation X's "Night of the Cadillacs", David Bowie's "Suffragette City" and James Brown's "Papa's Got a Brand New Bag" – as well as a re-recording of Hollywood Vampires Japanese bonus track "Ain't the Same" and new song "Killer Mahari". The Japanese edition also includes covers of "Love Song", originally by The Damned, and "Rock & Roll High School", originally by the Ramones. Cuts is the first L.A. Guns release to feature drummer Michael "Bones" Gershima, who replaced Steve Riley in January 1992. Riley performed on three tracks before his departure.

Track listing

Personnel

References

External links

1992 EPs
L.A. Guns EPs
Polydor Records EPs